Ciprian Virgil Dianu (born 13 January 1977) is a Romanian former football player and currently a manager. At the end of his career Dianu moved to Oradea, where he played for lower leagues teams and later became a football manager and also a coach at LPS Bihorul (Sports High School). His father, Virgil Dianu was also a footballer.

References

External links
 
 

1977 births
Sportspeople from Reșița
Living people
Romanian footballers
Association football defenders
Liga I players
Liga II players
ACF Gloria Bistrița players
FC Universitatea Cluj players
CSM Reșița players
FC Bihor Oradea players
FC Politehnica Iași (1945) players
CS Mioveni players
ACS Sticla Arieșul Turda players
Nemzeti Bajnokság I players
Diósgyőri VTK players
Zalaegerszegi TE players
Romanian expatriate footballers
Expatriate footballers in Hungary
Romanian expatriate sportspeople in Hungary
Romanian football managers
CS Luceafărul Oradea managers
CA Oradea managers